Moon Over Her Shoulder is a 1941 motion picture comedy directed by Alfred L. Werker.

Cast
John Sutton as Phillip Rossiter
Lynn Bari as Susan Rossiter
Alan Mowbray as Grover Sloan
Leonard Carey as Dusty
Dan Dailey as Rex Gibson
Lillian Yarbo as Juline, the Maid

References
"The Screen" by Bosley Crowther The New York Times November 5, 1941

External links
 

 
.

1941 films
1941 comedy films
American comedy films
20th Century Fox films
American black-and-white films
1940s American films